Dream 16 was a mixed martial arts event held by Fighting and Entertainment Group's mixed martial arts promotion Dream. The event took place on September 25, 2010, in Nagoya, Japan. The event aired live in North America on HDNet.

Background
This event served as the final for Dream's Light Heavyweight Grand Prix and crowned the first Dream Light Heavyweight Champion. Gegard Mousasi and Tatsuya Mizuno who won their opening round bouts at Dream 15 fought for the title.

A previously announced featherweight bout with Joe Warren fighting Michihiro Omigawa has been scrapped from this card.

Ikuhisa Minowa was previously reported to be fighting James Thompson, but instead fought Judo Olympic Gold Medalist Satoshi Ishii. Thompson's last minute opponent ending up being Deep Megaton Champion Yusuke Kawaguchi.

Results

2010 Light Heavyweight Grand Prix Bracket

References

See also
 Dream (mixed martial arts)
 List of Dream champions
 2010 in DREAM

Dream (mixed martial arts) events
2010 in mixed martial arts
Sport in Nagoya
Mixed martial arts in Japan
2010 in Japanese sport